Events in the year 1823 in India.

Incumbents
The Hon. John Adam, Governor-General, 1 January to 1 August.
Lord Amherst, Governor-General, 1823-28.

Events 
On September 11, Sirohi State taken under British protection in return for acknowledgment of supremacy and government in accordance with the advice of the political resident.

Law
Lascars Act (British statute)

References

 
India
Years of the 19th century in India